Otto Franz Rösch or Otto Roesch (24 March 1917 – 3 November 1995) was an Austrian politician of the SPÖ . He was a member of the Nsdap and worked in a National Socialist educational institution. He rose to become the Secretary of state in Austria.

Early life
He was born in Vienna, Austria on 24 March 1917. He studied (law and philosophy) at the University of Vienna and the University of Graz.

Career
He was a member of the Nsdap and in 1947 he was put on trial as a neo-nazi but he was acquitted. He had been arrested on charges of Nazi activities.

He rose to become the Secretary of State in Austria. During the Cold War he called for reducing defense spending. He also said the west was threatening the neutrality of Austria more than the East saying, "...the military threat from the West is larger." He had also been a Minister of the Interior in a previous government.

References

External links
Otto Rösch on the website of the Austrian Parliament
Otto Rösch on the website of the Landtag of Lower Austria
Entry on Otto Rösch in the Austria-Forum  (in the AEIOU Austria-Lexicon)
Otto Roesch. In: dasrotewien.at – web dictionary of the Viennese social democracy. SPÖ Vienna (ed.)
Radio recordings with Otto Rösch in the online archive of the Austrian media library

Interior ministers of Austria
Austrian Ministers of Defence
1917 births
1995 deaths
Social Democratic Party of Austria